Orosháza FC was a football club from Orosháza, Hungary. The club played in the Hungarian second division on several occasions, most recently being relegated in 2013.

References

Football clubs in Hungary
1950 establishments in Hungary
Association football clubs established in 1950